Andrea Ferrari (born 1 June 1986, in Milan) is an Italian football (soccer) goalkeeper. Despite having been designated the number 1 shirt, he was still the third choice goalkeeper at Atalanta B.C. In the season 2007/08, he went on loan at Monza.

References

1986 births
Living people
Footballers from Milan
Italian footballers
Atalanta B.C. players
Association football goalkeepers